Louis  (Luis Felipe Fernando Joseph; 25 August 1707 – 31 August 1724) was King of Spain from 15 January 1724 until his death in August the same year. His reign is one of the shortest in history, lasting for just over seven months.

Infante of Spain (1707–1709)

Louis was born at Palacio del Buen Retiro, in Madrid as the eldest son of the reigning King Philip V of Spain and his wife Maria Luisa Gabriella of Savoy. He was named after his great-grandfather Louis XIV of France.

Prince of Asturias (1709–1721)

At birth he was the heir apparent but was not given the traditional title of "Prince of Asturias" until April 1709. In 1714, when Louis was seven, his mother died, leaving him and his brothers, Infante Ferdinand and Infante Felipe Pedro. On 24 December 1714, Louis' father remarried to Elisabeth Farnese, the young heiress to the Duchy of Parma.

Marriage (1722)

As heir not only to the vast Spanish empire, but also to a new dynasty, it was decided that Louis would take a wife as soon as possible. On 20 January 1722, at Lerma, he met and married Louise Élisabeth d'Orléans, a daughter of Philippe d'Orléans, Duke of Orléans, cousin of Louis' father and then the Regent of France. The dowry of this marriage was an enormous 4 million livres.

King of Spain (1724)

Louis ruled for a short period between the time his father Philip V abdicated in his favour (14 January 1724) and his death from smallpox, just over seven months. King Philip sent him a letter informing him of his decision. He calls his son a great king. Louis sent his father a humble reply thanking him and signed his letter as Prince of Asturias. His marital problems dominated during his reign. His father kept tabs on him from San Ildefonso. To counter his father's influence, he surrounded himself with officials who had not served under Philip. His plans were to focus more on the American colonies rather than the lost Italian territories. On his death, his father returned to the throne, and reigned 22 more years until his own death in 1746. Louis was buried in the Cripta Real del Monasterio de El Escorial part of the El Escorial complex.

Appearance and personality 
Louis was tall and thin, with blonde hair. He was considered unattractive and the similarity between him and his maternal grandfather, Victor Amadeus II of Savoy, was notable. Apart from it, Louis had weak arms, which emphasized his delicacy.

Not much is known about Louis' personality. According to Vicente Bacallar, Marquis de San Felipe, he was extremely liberal, magnanimous and into making people to feel comfortable next to him. However, neither his liberty as King nor gentilism eclipsed his strong religiosity. Other contemporaries allegedly pointed out Louis had inherited his father's intelligence and charm and mother's moral and submission. Apart from it, many have argued Louis inherited his father's sexual appeal. He would have been bisexual, being initiated into such a practice by a servant, originally from Versailles. Historians believe that Lacotte, who was Louis' servant and who had a reputation of being a pedophile, was sent into Spanish royal court to seduce the prince, whose impotence was known. W. Clarke writes: the Spanish heir was as into boys as girls during the parties that he had, playing erotic games with both sexes; a line about Louis' sexual life was sang across streets of Madrid: Fiery as his mother, lascive as his father, flaming as his stepmother and onanist as a pedophile.

Ancestry

References

Sources
Danvila, Alfonso. El reinado relámpago, Luis I y Luisa Isabel de Orleáns, 1707–1724. Madrid: Espasa-Calpe, 1952. Reprinted as Luis I y Luisa Isabel de Orleans: el reinado relámpago. Madrid: Alderabán, 1997.

External links
   Luis I Spanish
A royal  suit of armor housed in The Met Museum made for him at age five by his great-grandfather, Louis XIV of France

1707 births
1724 deaths
18th-century Spanish monarchs
18th-century Navarrese monarchs
Nobility from Madrid
Princes of Asturias
House of Bourbon (Spain)
Knights of Santiago
Knights of the Golden Fleece of Spain
Deaths from smallpox
Infectious disease deaths in Spain
Spanish infantes
Grand Masters of the Order of the Golden Fleece
Burials in the Pantheon of Kings at El Escorial